Gracia Mendes Nasi (1510–1569), also known as Doña Gracia or La Señora (The Lady), was a Portuguese philanthropist and one of the wealthiest Jewish women of Renaissance Europe. She married Francisco Mendes/Benveniste. She was the maternal aunt and business partner of João Micas (alias, Hebrew name Joseph Nasi), who became a prominent figure in the politics of the Ottoman Empire. She also developed an escape network that saved hundreds of Conversos from the Inquisition. Her name – Graça in Portuguese – Gracia is Spanish for the Hebrew Hannah, which means Grace; she was also known by her Christianized name Beatriz (Beatrice) de Luna Miques.

Family background and early life 

Beatriz de Luna was born in Lisbon, Portugal in 1510. The family was from Aragon in Spain and were forcibly converted Jews known as conversos (also called Crypto-Jews, Marranos, New Christians, and Secret Jews). So that they could still practice Judaism, the family had fled to Portugal when the Catholic Monarchs of Spain, Isabella I of Castile and Ferdinand II of Aragon, expelled the Jews in 1492. Five years later, in 1497, they were forcibly converted to Catholicism along with all the other Jews and Muslims in Portugal at that time. Beatrice's father Álvaro de Luna (possibly a relative of Álvaro de Luna from Spain in the mid-15th century that was a colleague of Don Abraham Benveniste) was married to Filipa or Felipa Mendes Benveniste, the sister of Francisco Mendes and Diogo Mendes.

Marriage and widowhood in Lisbon, Portugal 
In 1528, Beatriz de Luna married her uncle, the very rich black pepper trader and new Christian in Lisbon, Francisco Mendes. Francisco also happened to belong to the same very prominent Jewish family as her mother – Benveniste from Castile and Aragon – and was also the great grandchild of Don Abraham Benveniste of Castile. The couple were believed to have been married in the great cathedral of Lisbon, in a public Catholic wedding, and then to have had a crypto-Judaic ceremony with the signing of a ketubah. Francisco Mendes and his brother, Diogo Mendes, were the directors of a powerful trading company and bank of world renown, with agents across Europe and around the Mediterranean. The House of Mendes/Benveniste probably began as a company trading precious objects and currency arbitrage. Following the beginning of the Age of Discovery and the finding, by the Portuguese, of a sea route to India, the Mendes brothers became particularly important spice traders. They also traded in silver – the silver was needed to pay the Asians for those spices. In January 1538, when Beatrice was only twenty-eight years old, Francisco died. In his will Francisco divided his fortune between Beatrice and his brother and business partner, Diogo; this bold decision put Beatrice on the path to becoming the successful and renowned business woman of the sixteenth century that we know her for today. Later on, Beatrice asked the Pope to move the remains of Francisco to a new location. When the approval arrived she moved them to the Mount of Olives in Jerusalem.

Beginnings in Antwerp, Belgium 
A few years before Francisco's death in 1538, his brother, Diogo, had opened a branch office of their house in the city of Antwerp together with his relative Abraham Benveniste. Soon after Francisco's death, Beatrice Mendes moved to Antwerp to join Diogo with her infant daughter, Ana (the future wife of Joseph Nasi) and her younger sister, Brianda de Luna. The move from Lisbon was also timely due to the changing political landscape in Portugal, when as of 23 May 1536, the Pope Paul III ordered the establishment of a Portuguese Inquisition.

Once they settled in Antwerp, Beatrice invested her family fortune in her brother-in-law's business, and started to make a name for herself not only as his business partner but as an independent business woman herself. The relationship between the de Luna and Mendes households became even stronger, with the marriage between Beatrice's sister, Brianda, and Diogo Mendes. But just five years after Beatrice Mendes settled in Antwerp, Diogo also died. It was now 1542, and in his will he left his niece and sister-in-law control of the Mendes commercial empire, making Beatrice Mendes an important businesswoman. The enormous wealth enabled her to influence kings and popes, which she did to protect her fellow Conversos. It also enabled her to finance her escape network. It is believed she was the driving force behind the publication of the Ferrara Bible from Sephardic source texts. The second, public printing of the book was dedicated to her. All the while she had to fend off attempts by various monarchs to confiscate her fortune by trying to arrange a marriage of her only daughter to their relatives. Had this happened, a large portion of the family wealth would have been lost, as it would have come under the control of her daughter's husband. Beatrice Mendes resisted all these attempts, which often put her in personal peril.

Starting in Antwerp, Habsburg Netherlands, she began to develop an escape network that helped hundreds of fellow Crypto-Jews flee Habsburg Spain and Portugal, where they had been constantly under threat of arrest as heretics by the Inquisition. These fleeing conversos were first sent secretly to spice ships, owned or operated by the House of Mendes/Benveniste, that sailed regularly between Lisbon and Antwerp. In Antwerp, Beatrice Mendes and her staff gave them instructions and the money to travel by cart and foot over the Alps to the great port city of Venice, where arrangements were made to transport them by ship to the Ottoman Empire Greece and Turkey in the East. At that time the Ottoman Empire, under the Muslim Turks, welcomed Jews to their lands. The escape route was carefully planned. Even so, many died on the way as they traversed the mountain paths of the high Alps.

Under Beatrice Mendes (Gracia Nasi), the House of Mendes/Benveniste dealt with King Henry II of France, Charles V, Holy Roman Emperor, his sister Mary, Governor of the Low Countries, Popes Paul III and Paul IV, and Suleiman the Magnificent, the Ottoman Sultan. These dealings involved commercial activities, loans, and bribes. Earlier payments to the Pope by the House of Mendes and their associates had delayed the establishment of the Inquisition in Portugal (see History of the Jews in Portugal).

Life in Venice and Ferrara, Italy 
In 1544, she fled once again, this time to the Republic of Venice, and took up residence on the Grand Canal. The city-state offered Jews and conversos a safe base to live and conduct business, although most practicing Jews were confined in crowded ghettos; because of this situation that Jewish people were put into, the Mendes family most likely practiced Judaism secretly while still putting up the Catholic charade. She continued the type of business that she did with her brother-in-law, and very successfully traded pepper, grain, and textiles. While in Venice, she had a dispute with her sister, Brianda, Diogo's wife, regarding his estate, and left yet again to the nearby city state of Ferrara to avoid the ruling the Venetian Giudici al Forestier (Tribunal for the Affairs of Foreigners) decided would end the sisters' conflict over equal control of the fortune.

The city of Ferrara was eager to accept the Mendes family; Ercole II, Duke of Este (1508-1559), agreed to the terms of Diogo Mendes's will so that the wealthy family would move to his city, and received them gracefully in 1549. In Ferrara, Beatrice Mendes, for the first time in her life, was able to openly practice Judaism in a distinguished Sephardi Jewish Community and in a city that recognized her rights. She chose the Hebrew name Nasi (her daughter's name) instead of her own Latin/Jewish name Benveniste. This time in her life is most likely when she started to become known as Doña Gracia Nasi. The genealogy of her family starts to get a little confusing here; this is most likely when her sister Brianda adopted the name Reyna, when Beatrice's daughter Ana became known as Reyna as well, and also when Brianda's daughter, named after Beatrice, was given the name Gracia. The family's new proud Jewish identity brought Doña Gracia beyond the realm of commercial business, and she became a large benefactor and organizer for resettling Jewish people using her commercial network during the Jewish diaspora. Doña Gracia became very involved with the Sephardic colony in Ferrara, and became an active supporter of the burst of literacy and printing among the Jews of Ferrara. Because of her humanitarian efforts and other successes, books that were printed during this time, like the Ferrara Bible (published in 1553) and Consolation for the Tribulations of Israel (published 1553, written by Samuel Usque), were dedicated to Doña Gracia Nasi.

The move to Ferrara, however, did not end the quarrel between Doña Gracia and her sister, Brianda (now Reyna de Luna), over control of the estate. To finally end the dispute, Doña Gracia briefly went to Venice to settle with her sister in the Venetian Senate.

Final years in Constantinople 
After the settlement was made, she, her daughter Ana (now Reyna Nasi), and a large entourage moved to Constantinople (now Istanbul), in the Ottoman domains, where she arranged for her daughter to marry her husband's nephew and business partner, Don Joseph Nasi. This move in 1553, just as her others, proved to be just in time as the political atmosphere in Counter-Reformation Italy started to become hostile. In Constantinople, Doña Gracia lived fashionably in the European quarter of Galata. She was very dedicated to her Jewish lifestyle, and assumed a role of leadership in the Sephardi world of the Ottoman Empire.

After the death of her spouse in 1579, she established her own printing business, one in Belvedere, near Constantinople, and another press in the Constantinople suburb of Kuruçeşme. She published at least fifteen books, including a tractate of the Talmud as well as several prayer books. She was the first Jewish woman to have established her own press rather than inheriting it, and the first woman printer and publisher in the Ottoman Empire.

In 1556, soon after Doña Gracia arrived in Constantinople, Pope Pius V sentenced a group of Conversos in Ancona to Execution by burning at the stake, claiming they were still practicing Jewish rites. In response, Doña Gracia organized a trade embargo of the port of Ancona in the Papal States. In Istanbul, she built synagogues and yeshivas. One of the synagogues is named after her (La Señora). These institutions were created primarily to help the refugees to return to Judaism, their ancestral faith.

In 1558, Doña Gracia was granted a long-term lease on the Tiberias region in Galilee (part of Ottoman Syria at the time), from Sultan Suleiman the Magnificent, in exchange for guaranteeing a substantial increase in the yearly tax revenues. The Ottoman Empire, under the Sultan, had conquered that part of the Holy Land some years earlier, but it was largely a desolate place. As a result, she obtained ruling authority over the Tiberias area. With the help of the Sultan, she then began to rebuild the area's abandoned towns to make them available to refugees so they could settle there if they wished. Her aim was to make Tiberias into a major new center of Jewish settlement, trade and learning. A Jewish traveler who visited Tiberias around this time mentions how she had lent support to the Jewish community there, and how after her death they were compelled to ask for Jewish donations elsewhere. This venture has often been called one of the earliest attempts at a modern Zionist movement. Doña Gracia (Mendes) Nasi died in Istanbul in early 1569.

Legacy 

Though she disappeared into oblivion almost immediately and remained hardly known for the subsequent 500 years, that began changing in 1969 possibly due to a new sense of relevance among today's women. Indeed, Dona Gracia is fast becoming a cult figure on the world stage. New York City designated a Doña Gracia Day in June 2010, followed by a similar proclamation in Philadelphia a year later. Israel's political leaders honoured her for the first time in October 2010. A dedicated website was launched in 2011. She now has a Facebook page. The Turkish government sponsored a Dona Gracia evening in New York City and has also sponsored an exhibit in Lisbon. There have been lectures, articles and festivals in her honour all over Europe. The growing numbers of women in business and the professions who attend the programs identify with her ambition, courage and even personal loneliness. An Italian white wine has been named after her. The Israeli Government Coins and Medals Corporation has produced a commemorative medal. She now has a museum in Tiberias devoted to her life and deeds. She is idolized by the descendants of conversos she saved, now living in southern Italy, Central and South America and the United States. In the TV series Muhteşem Yüzyıl, Gracia Mendes Nasi is portrayed by Turkish actress Dolunay Soysert.

See also
Esther Handali
Esperanza Malchi
Rüstem Pasha
Nurbanu Sultan

Citations

References
jwa.org
Andrée Aelion Brooks, The Woman who Defied Kings Paragon House, 2002
Marianna D. Birnbaum, 2003: The long journey of Gracia Mendes
"Nasi, Gracia", in The Encyclopaedia Judaica
Gad Nassi, Rebecca Toueg, Doña Gracia Nasi, Women's International Zionist Organisation, Tel Aviv, 1990
Cecil Roth, Dona Gracia of the House of Nasi, The Jewish Publication Society of America, Philadelphia, 1948
Novel - The Ghost of Hannah Mendes  St. Martin's Griffin (November 16, 2001)
Di Leone Leoni A. The Hebrew Portuguese Nations in Antwerp and London at the Time of Charles V and Henry VIII, New Jersey.
Solomon H. P. and Leone Leoni A. "Mendes, Benveniste, De Luna, Micas, Nasci: The State of the Art (1522-1558)". The Jewish Quarterly Review 88, 3–4, 1998, pp. 135–211.

Related books
Stadtler, Bea. "The story of Dona Gracia Mendes." 1969.  
Birnbaum, Marianna. "The Long Journey of Gracia Mendes." 2001.
Brooks, Andree "Woman Who Defied Kings: The Life and Times of Dona Gracia Nasi." 2010
Maynes, Mary Jo., and Ann Beth. Waltner. "Chapter 5 Families in Global Markets." The Family: A World History. Oxford: Oxford UP, 2012. 65–67. Print.

External links
Dona Gracia Project
Out of Spain educational materials
Biography at Jewish Heritage Online Magazine
House of Dona Gracia museum, Tiberias
Lecture on Dona Gracia Nasi by Henry Abramson

1510 births
1569 deaths
Ottoman culture
Politics of the Ottoman Empire
Portuguese Jews
16th-century Sephardi Jews
Sephardi Jews from the Ottoman Empire
Portuguese emigrants to the Ottoman Empire
16th-century businesspeople from the Ottoman Empire
People from Lisbon
Portuguese businesspeople
Jewish philanthropists
Sephardi Jews in Ottoman Palestine
Portuguese women in business
16th-century Jews
16th-century businesswomen
Jewish women in business
Jewish women philanthropists
Women printers
16th-century printers